Tadla-Azilal (Berber: Tadla-Aẓilal) was formerly one of the sixteen regions of Morocco from 1997 to 2015. It was situated in central Morocco. It covered an area of 17,125 km2 and had a population of 1,607,509 (2014 census). The capital was Beni Mellal. In 2015, the region annexed Khénifra Province (from Meknès-Tafilalet Region) and Khouribga Province (from Chaouia-Ouardigha Region) to form the Region of Béni Mellal-Khénifra.

The region is made into of the following provinces :

 Azilal Province
 Béni-Mellal Province
 Fquih Ben Salah Province (since 2012)

References

Former regions of Morocco